{{DISPLAYTITLE:C15H18O6}}
The molecular formula C15H18O6 (molar mass: 294.30 g/mol, exact mass: 294.1103 u) may refer to:

 Dihydropicrotoxinin
 Merrilactone A
 Tutin

Molecular formulas